Marshall Sylver (born Marshall Walter Sylwestrzak) is an American motivational speaker, author, and performance hypnotist who works primarily in Las Vegas, Nevada. He has billed himself as "The World's Fastest Hypnotist".

His Las Vegas shows have been at the Sahara Hotel, the Stratosphere, the Palms and Harrah’s. He has been on television shows including "Late Night with David Letterman" and "The Montel Williams Show". He hosts a radio show and starred in a 2010 movie, in addition to the book he wrote called Passion, Profit & Power.

Early years
Marshall Sylwestrzak is the seventh of 10 children born to Virginia "Babe" Sylwestrzak, and spent most of his childhood in Almont, Michigan. While Marshall was growing up, Sylver’s mom worked various jobs, including owning "a little truck stop/airport restaurant business." Later, she worked for a local Office of Economic Opportunity as supervisor of three counties.

It was during Sylver's early childhood that he first became interested in magic after watching a brother perform some tricks he had learned from an issue of Boys' Life.

"Even though I was only seven at the time, it was obvious to me what my brother was doing. But when I impressed my Dad when I did the tricks myself, it was such an incredible feeling....And I was hooked," he said.

In 1976, his family moved to San Diego, where he attended Kearny High School.

After moving to San Diego, Sylver worked in retail and later as a gas station attendant while in school. It’s in that job that Sylver met the program director for 104 KJOY-FM radio in San Diego, who offered him an internship. One evening at the station, Sylver was given the opportunity to DJ when one of the on-air personalities called in. He was later hired as a regular DJ.

Career 
Before becoming a stage hypnotist in 1985, he also worked as a professional magician, in addition to his paid disc jockey work noted above.

Hypnosis Show
Sylver had a hypnosis show at Harrah's in Las Vegas in 2007
and at the Palms in 2003.

He also had shows at the Sahara Hotel and the Stratosphere in the mid-1990s.

Television 
Sylver has appeared on Late Night with David Letterman
and The Montel Williams Show.

He had an infomercial, Passion Profit & Power, that ran in the mid-1990s.

In the first episode of the third series of Louis Theroux's Weird Weekends, Sylver's seminars were featured, where the power of persuasion was purportedly used to motivate attendees to become self-made millionaires.

Seminars 
Sylver is a motivational speaker and business consultant. He was a speaker at the Learning Annex "Wealth Expo" along with Tony Robbins in 2006
as well as the First Annual Entrepreneur Success Summit in 2010.
He also hosts the "Turning Point Seminar."

In April 2003, Sylver was indicted for theft after nine of his self-improvement program's 1,200 clients alleged that he had failed to honor a money-back guarantee. Five had already received their refunds in small claims court. In December, after three weeks of proceedings, the case ended in a mistrial.

Books and CDs 
Sylver wrote a book titled Passion, Profit & Power, which was published by Simon & Schuster in 1997, along with audio cassettes by the same name, as part of a subconscious training system. Passion, Profit & Power was a bestseller from Berita Book Centre and MPH Bookstores for the week of July 19, 1997.

Radio and Movies 
Sylver hosts a radio show titled "Get Rich Radio."
He starred in the 2010 movie Tranced, which was the first movie intended to hypnotize the audience.

Court Cases 
In 2003 Sylver was tried on nine felony charges of fraud related to his Millionaire Mentorship Program. Prosecutors accused Slyver of swindling consumers that were promised double the cost of the program (which was between $4,500 and $6,500) if they did not double their investment; no consumers received such a refund. Aside from indictment charges, Sylver faced "numerous other gambling debts." A mistrial was declared after jurors were unable to come to a unanimous verdict.

Book 
 Passion Profit Power. Marshall Sylver. Simon & Schuster (January 21, 1997)

References

External links
Marshall Sylver Home Page
Mr. Show with Bob and David sketch: "Power, Profit, and Passion"

Living people
American hypnotists
1962 births
People from Almont, Michigan